The ISCB Overton Prize is a computational biology prize awarded annually for outstanding accomplishment by a scientist in the early to mid stage of his or her career. Laureates have made significant contribution to the field of computational biology either through research, education, service, or a combination of the three.

The prize was established by the International Society for Computational Biology (ISCB) in memory of  a major contributor to the field of bioinformatics and member of the ISCB Board of Directors who died unexpectedly in 2000.

The Overton Prize is traditionally awarded at the Intelligent Systems for Molecular Biology (ISMB) conference.

Laureates
Laureates include
2022 -  
2021 - Barbara Engelhardt
2020 - 
2019 - Christophe Dessimoz
2018 - Cole Trapnell
2017 - Christoph Bock
2016 - Debora Marks
2015 - Curtis Huttenhower
2014 - Dana Pe'er
2013 - Gonçalo Abecasis
2012 - Ziv Bar-Joseph
2011 - Olga Troyanskaya
2010 - Steven E. Brenner
2009 - Trey Ideker
2008 - Aviv Regev
2007 - Eran Segal
2006 - Mathieu Blanchette
2005 - Ewan Birney
2004 - Uri Alon
2003 - Jim Kent
2002 - David Baker
2001 - Christopher Burge

See also

 List of biology awards

References

Bioinformatics
Biology awards